"Greatest Day" is a song by British singer Beverley Knight, released as the fifth single from her second studio album, Prodigal Sista (1998), on 5 July 1999. The track contains a re-recorded sample of "Act Like You Know" by American R&B group Fat Larry's Band. "Greatest Day" became Knight's highest-charting single up to that point when it peaked at number 14 on the UK Singles Chart. The music video for the song was shot by director Jake Nava, who had previously shot Beverley's "Made It Back '99" video.

Track listings

UK CD1
 "Greatest Day" (classic mix)
 "Weekend Thing"
 "Greatest Day" (Ruffland mix)

UK CD2
 "Greatest Day" (classic mix)
 "Greatest Day" (Curtis & Moore 12-inch mix)
 "Greatest Day" (two step mix)

UK cassette single
 "Greatest Day" (classic mix)
 "Greatest Day" (Ruffland mix)

Dutch CD single
 "Greatest Day" (classic mix)
 "Weekend Thing"

Personnel
Personnel are taken from the UK CD1 liner notes.

 Beverley Knight – writing, vocals
 Pule Pheto – writing
 Neville Thomas – writing
 Mark Birts – writing ("Act Like You Know")
 Terry Price – writing ("Act Like You Know")
 Nicholas J. Martinelli – writing ("Act Like You Know")
 Rob Harris – guitar
 Derrick McIntyre – bass

 Mike Spencer – keyboards, production
 Shane Meehan – drums
 The Horny Horns – horns
 Elisa – strings
 Andy Kowalski – mixing
 Dillon Gallagher – initial programming
 Simon de Winter – initial programming

Charts

References

1998 songs
1999 singles
Beverley Knight songs
Music videos directed by Jake Nava
Songs written by Beverley Knight
Songs written by Neville Thomas
Songs written by Pule Pheto